Barzelletta (lit. "jest") was a popular verse form used by frottola composers in Italy in the fifteenth and sixteenth centuries. It is generally trochaic, with eight syllables per line. The barzelletta consists of two sections: a reprisa which is four rhyming lines (abba or abab), a stanza, and a volta. The barzelletta tends to be lively and dance-like, with heavy accents on cadences.

Notes

References
Don Harrán. "Barzelletta", Grove Music Online, ed. L. Macy (accessed September 15, 2006), grovemusic.com (subscription access).

16th-century music genres
Song forms